Al-Bahariyah is a village in eastern Ghouta,  east of Damascus city center. The village is administratively a part of the Douma District in the Rif Dimashq Governorate. The village was largely destroyed in August 2013 and was the site of an alleged chemical weapons attack during the Syrian Civil War.

References

Populated places in Douma District
Cities in Syria